AKM Shamsul Huda is a Jatiya Party politician, lawyer and the former Member of Parliament of Chittagong-3.

Career
Huda was elected to parliament from Chittagong-3 as a Jatiya Party candidate in 1986 and 1988.

References

Awami League politicians
Living people
3rd Jatiya Sangsad members
4th Jatiya Sangsad members
Year of birth missing (living people)